Urban wildlife is wildlife that can live or thrive in urban/suburban environments or around densely populated human settlements such as townships.

Some urban wildlife, such as house mice, are synanthropic, ecologically associated with and even evolved to become entirely dependent on human habitats.  For instance, the range of many synanthropic species is expanded to latitudes at which they could not survive the winter outside of the shelterings provided by human settlements.  Other species simply tolerate cohabiting around humans and use the remaining urban forests, parklands, green spaces and garden/street vegetations as niche habitats, in some cases gradually becoming sufficiently accustomed around humans to also become synanthropic over time. These species represent a minority of the natural creatures that would normally inhabit an area, and contain a large proportions of feral and introduced species as opposed to truly native species. For example, a 2014 compilation of studies found that only 8% of native bird and 25% of native plant species were present in urban areas compared with estimates of non-urban density of species.

Urban wildlife can be found at any latitude that supports human dwellings - the list of animals that will venture into urbanized human settlements to forage on horticultures or to scavenge from trash runs from monkeys in the tropics to polar bears in the Arctic.

Different types of urban areas support different kinds of wildlife. One general feature of bird species that adapt well to urban environments is they tend to be the species with bigger brains, perhaps allowing them to be more behaviorally adaptable to the more volatile urban environment. Arthropods (insects, spiders and millipedes), gastropods (land snails and slugs), various worms and some reptiles (e.g. house geckos) can also thrive well in the niches of human settlements.

Evolution
Urban environments can exert novel selective pressures on organisms, sometimes leading to new adaptations. For example, the weed Crepis sancta, found in France, has two types of seed, heavy and fluffy. The heavy ones land near the parent plant, whereas the fluffy seeds float further away on the wind. In urban environments, seeds that float far often land on infertile concrete surfaces.  Within about 5-12 generations the weed has been found to evolve to produce significantly more heavy seeds than its rural relatives. Among vertebrates, a case is urban great tits, which have been found to sing at a higher pitch than their rural relatives so that their songs stand out above the city noise, although this is probably a learned rather than evolved response. Urban silvereyes, an Australian bird, make contact calls that are higher frequency and slower than those of rural silvereyes. As it appears that contact calls are instinctual and not learnt, this has been suggested as evidence that urban silvereyes have undergone recent evolutionary adaptation so as to better communicate in noisy urban environments.

Animals that inhabit urban environments have differences in morphology, physiology and behavior when compared to animals that inhabit less urbanized areas. Hormone-mediated maternal effects are capable mechanisms of offspring phenotypic developmental modification. For instance, when female birds deposit androgens into their eggs, this affects many diverse aspects of offspring development and phenotype. Environmental factors that can influence the concentration of androgens in avian eggs include nest predation risk, breeding density, food abundance and parasite prevalence, all factors of which differ between urban and natural habitats. In a study that compared antibody and maternal hormone concentrations in eggs between an urban population and a forest population of European blackbirds, there were found to be clear differences in yolk androgen concentrations between the two populations. Although these differences cannot be attributed definitively (more studies have to be performed), they might result from different environments causing females to plastically adjust yolk androgens. Different yolk androgen levels are likely to program offspring phenotype.

Plant genetic variation has an influence on herbivore population dynamics and other dependent communities. Conversely, different arthropod genotypes have varying abilities to live on different host plant species. Differential reproduction of herbivores could lead to adaptation to particular host plant genotypes. For instance, in two experiments that examined local adaptation and evolution of a free-feeding aphid (Chaitophorus populicola) in response to genetic variants of its host plant (Populus angustifolia), it was found that, 21 days (about two aphid generations) after aphid colony transplantation onto trees from foreign sites, aphid genotype composition had changed. In the experiments, tree cuttings and aphid colonies were collected from three different sites and used to conduct a reciprocal transplant experiment. Aphids that were transplanted onto trees from the same site produced 1.7-3.4 times as many offspring as aphids that were transplanted onto trees from different sites. These two results indicate that activities of human perturbation that cause plant evolution may also result in evolutionary responses in interacting species that could escalate to affect entire communities.

Wildlife species that inhabit urban areas often experience shifts in food and resource availability. Some species, at times, must resort to human handouts or even human refuse as a source of food. One animal notorious for relying on such means for nutritional intake is the American white ibis. In a study that tested physiological challenge, the innate and adaptive immunity of two groups of white ibis (both consisting of 10 white ibis nurtured in captivity), one group being fed a simulated anthropogenic diet and the other being fed a natural ibis diet, it was determined that the wildlife consumption of a diet with anthropogenic components (such as white bread) may be detrimental to a species’ ability to battle bacterial pathogens.

Human–wildlife conflict 
While urban areas tend to decrease the overall biodiversity of species within the city, most cities retain the flora and fauna characteristic of their geographic area. As rates of urbanization and city sprawl increase worldwide, many urban areas sprawl further into wildlife habitat, causing increased human-wildlife encounters and the potential for negative and conflict-based encounters. Humans have lived alongside and near wild animals for centuries, but the expansion of the study of urban ecology has allowed for new information surrounding human-wildlife interactions. Human wildlife conflict can be categorized into disease transmission, physical attacks, and property damage, and can be inflicted by a range of wildlife, from predatory tigers to grain-eating rodents.

Benefits of human–wildlife interactions 

While negative human-wildlife conflicts can be damaging to the physical health of humans or property, human-wildlife interactions can be extremely beneficial in terms ecosystem health and cultural experiences.The presence of native species allows systems and food chains to function in a healthy way, providing ecosystem services to the humans living around these areas. These services include the provisioning of food and water, flood control, cultural services, and nutrient cycling. Due to those perceived benefits urban rewilding is now an active movement.

Costs of conflict 
The most direct impacts of human-wildlife conflict include loss of livelihood due to property damage, loss of possessions due to property damage, injury, or transmission of disease from wildlife to humans. After the direct impacts of conflict, however, the people facing human-wildlife conflict are left with long-term issues including opportunity costs and long-term fear of wildlife.

Conflicts between human and wildlife are most likely to occur in areas intermediate between rural and entirely urban landscapes, and these interactions are most likely to involve species with broad diets able to live in areas with high populations. Some areas are subject to more extreme conflicts between humans and wildlife, such as in Mozambique and Namibia, where more than 100 people are killed each year by crocodiles. In Asia and Africa, many communities are also subject to 10-15% loss of agricultural output to elephants. Disease transmission is also significant in cases of human-wildlife conflict, where sprawling cities can expand into environments that increase exposure to hosts of vector-borne diseases, causing large outbreaks in cities with greater density of people. Modern examples of disease outbreaks from wildlife include the H5N1 virus (originating from and spread via birds) and SARS-CoV-2 (likely originated as a bat virome before jumping species). With the latter causing the COVID-19 pandemic that wrought significant economic, political, and sociological turmoil across humanity within one year from its outbreak.

Conflict management 
At the center of human-wildlife conflicts in urban areas are social attitudes towards wildlife encounters. A certain community's perception of risk of wildlife encounter greatly impacts their attitude towards wildlife, particularly in situations where livelihoods or safety are at risk. Many cutting-edge wildlife conflict management proposals include education programs to inform the public of both the risks and benefits of interacting with urban wildlife, and how to prevent hysteria and future negative encounters. Furthermore, conflict management includes addressing the hidden impacts of wildlife conflict, such as the disruption psychosocial wellbeing, disruption of livelihood and food sources, and food insecurity.

Broadly distributed
Some urban species have a cosmopolitan (i.e. nonselective) distribution, in some cases almost global. They include cockroaches, silverfish, house mice, black/brown rats, house sparrows, rock doves and feral populations of domestic species.

Africa

As Africa becomes increasingly urbanized, native animals are exposed to this new environment with the potential of uniquely African urban ecologies developing. In the Cape Town urban area in South Africa, there is increasing conflict between human development and nearby populations of Chacma baboons due to baboons growing dependence on tourists and the urban environment as sources of food. Elsewhere in Africa, vervet monkeys as well as baboons adapt to urbanization, and similarly enter houses and gardens for food. African penguins are also known to invade urban areas, searching for food and a safe place to breed, even nesting inside storm drains. Simon's Town, next to the popular Boulders Beach had to take action to restrict penguin movement due to the noise and damage they caused. There are reports of leopards roaming suburban areas in cities such as Nairobi, Kenya and Windhoek, Namibia. Reptiles like the house gecko (Hemidactylus) can be found in houses.

Australia
Urban areas in Australia are a particularly fruitful habitat type for many wildlife species. Australian cities are hotspots for threatened species diversity and have been shown to support more threatened animal and plant species on a per unit-area basis than all other non-urban habitat types. An analysis of urban sensitive bird species (birds that are easily disturbed and displaced) found that revegetation was effective at encouraging birds back into urban greenspaces, but also found that weed control was not. Invasive plant species such as Lantana (L. camara) actually provides refuge for some bird species such as the superb fairywren (Malurus cyaneus) and silvereye (Zosterops lateralis), in the absence of native plant equivalents.

Some species of native animals on Australia, such as various bird species including the Australian magpie, crested pigeon, rainbow lorikeet, willie wagtail, laughing kookaburra and tawny frogmouth, are able to survive as urban wildlife, although introduced birds such as the Old World sparrow are more common in the centre of larger cities.  Some of the most resilient small marsupial species including the common ringtail/brushtail possum, sugar glider and Northern brown bandicoot, and some megabats such as the grey-headed flying fox, have also adapted somewhat to the urban/suburban environment. This being said there are many threats to urban areas in Australia such as habitat loss and fragmentation, invasive species (such as cats and Indian mynas), pest species (such as noisy miners), weeds propagule pressure, and other disturbance that accompany intensive human land use. If biodiversity is to flourish in urban areas, efforts at the community scale thorough initiatives such as Land for Wildlife and private land conservation, as well as policy and management efforts through restricting land clearing and providing incentives to retain nature in cities is needed.

Japan
Although culled aggressively in most of Japan for being a pest, the Sika deer is, for religious reasons, protected in the city of Nara and has become part of the urban environment. Due to the denseness of Japanese cities, birdlife is not as common as other parts of the world, though typical urban birds such as crows, sparrows, and gulls have adapted well.

Hawaii
The urban birdlife of Hawaii is dominated by introduced species, with native species largely remaining only in preserved areas.

New Zealand
The birdlife in the most urban parts of New Zealand is dominated by introduced species, with bush fragments in the less urbanized areas allowing native species to cohabit.

India

In parts of India, like in some cities of Africa and south-east Asia, Monkeys, such as langurs, also enter cities for food, and cause havoc in food markets when they steal fruit from the vendors. 
In Mumbai, leopards have entered neighbourhoods surrounding the Sanjay Gandhi National Park and killed several people, as the park itself is besieged by a surrounding burgeoning population, where poaching and illegal woodcutting is rife. In Mount Abu, Rajasthan, sloth bears have grown accustomed to entering the town throughout the year to feed on hotel waste in open rubbish bins, and injure several people each year in chance encounters.

Persisting green patches have helped retain over 100 bird species in the mega-city Delhi, which is the capital city of India. Also in Delhi, ponds (wetlands < 5 ha) have been invaluable to support a very diverse bird community helped partly by management interventions that included islands and greening around the wetlands to make the wetlands attractive for people. Ponds constituted 0.5% of the land area of Delhi but supported 37% of all bird species ever documented in the city suggesting that even highly populated cities like Delhi can be important bird refugia if small habitat patches are retained.

Europe

Many towns in the United Kingdom have Urban Wildlife Groups that work to preserve and encourage urban wildlife. One example is Oxford.

Outside
Urban areas range from fully urban – areas having little green space and mostly covered by paving, tarmac, or buildings – to suburban areas with gardens and parks. Pigeons are found scavenging on scraps of food left by humans and nesting on buildings, even in the most urban areas, as the tall buildings resemble their natural rocky homes in the mountains. Rats can also be found scavenging on food. Gulls of various types also breed and scavenge in various U.K. cities. A study by the bird biologist Peter Rock, Europe's leading authority on urban gulls, into the rise of herring gulls and lesser black-backed gulls in Bristol has discovered that in 20 years the city's colony has grown from about 100 pairs to more than 1,200. From a gull's point of view, buildings are simply cliff-sided islands, with no predators and much nearby food. The trend is the same in places as far apart as Gloucester and Aberdeen. With an endless supply of food, more city chicks survive each year, and become accustomed to urban living. They in turn breed even more birds, with less reason to undertake a winter migration.

Waterfowl such as Ducks, Coots, Geese, Swans, and Moorhens thrive in gardens and parks with access to water. Small populations can form around fountains and other ornamental features, far from natural bodies of water, provided there are adequate amounts of food such as aquatic plants growing in the fountain.

In the United Kingdom, improvements in water quality in urban areas have coincided with reintroduction and conservation projects for the Eurasian otter, resulting in frequent sightings of these animals in urban and suburban environments. Otters have been recorded in settlements of a variety of sizes, ranging from large towns and small cities such as Andover, Inverness and Exeter, to major cities such as London, Manchester, Birmingham and Edinburgh.

From a study conducted on Great Tits living in ten European cities and in ten nearby forests. An analysis was made of the way the birds used songs to attract mates and establish territorial boundaries. Hans Slabbekoorn, of Leiden University in the Netherlands, said that city birds adapt to life by singing faster, shorter, and higher-pitch songs in the cities compared to forests. The forest birds sing low and they sing slow. Great Tits living in noisy cities have to compete with the low-frequency sounds of heavy traffic, which means their songs go up in pitch to make themselves heard. A bird that sang like Barry White in the forest sounded more like Michael Jackson in the big city.

The advent of these animals has also drawn a predator, as Peregrine falcons have also been known to nest in urban areas, nesting on tall buildings and preying on pigeons. The peregrine falcon is becoming more nocturnal in urban environments, using urban lighting to spot its prey. This has provided them with new opportunities to hunt night-flying birds and bats. Red foxes are also in many urban and suburban areas in the U.K. as scavengers. They scavenge, and eat insects and small vertebrates such as pigeons and rodents. People also leave food for them to eat in their gardens. One red fox was even found living at the top of the then-partially completed Shard in 2011, having climbed the stairwell to reach its temporary home some 72 stories above ground.

In some cases even large animals have been found living in cities. Berlin has wild boars. Wild roe deer are becoming increasingly common in green areas in Scottish towns and cities, such as in the Easterhouse suburb of Glasgow. Urban waterways can also contain wildlife, including large animals. In London, since improvements in water quality in the Thames, seals and porpoises have been seen in its waters in the center of the city.

Inside houses
Numerous animals can also live within buildings. Insects that sometimes inhabit buildings include various species of small beetles such as ladybirds, which often seek refuge inside buildings during the winter months, as well as cockroaches. See also housefly.

North America
Many North American species have successfully adapted to urban and suburban environments and are thriving. Typical examples include urban coyotes, the top predator of such regions. Other common urban animals include predators such as (especially) red foxes, grey foxes, and bobcats that prey on small animals such as rodents. Omnivores such as raccoons, Virginia opossums, and striped skunks are abundant, but seldom seen, due to their elusive and nocturnal nature. In the south and southeastern United States and Mexico, the nine-banded armadillo also fills this niche, but due to the armadillo's lack of thick fur, they are unable to thrive in more northern climates. Squirrels, including the American red squirrel, fox squirrel, and especially the eastern grey squirrel are extremely common in areas with enough trees. Herbivores forage in the early morning and evening, with cottontail rabbits, and, in dryer parts of the country, jackrabbits, as well as the two most common deer species in North America: the white-tailed deer and the mule deer. Shy of humans, deer are often spotted as a mother with fawns, or a lone buck creeping through the trees and bushes. As whitetails prefer forest edge and meadow to actual dense forest, the cutting of forests has actually made more habitat for the white-tailed deer, which has increased its numbers beyond what they were at when Europeans arrived in America. In some cities, older deer seem to have learned how to cross streets, as they look back and forth looking for cars while crossing roads, while fawns and younger deer will recklessly run out without looking; most traffic accidents involving deer happen with deer that have just left their mother, and are less likely to watch for cars.

Red-tailed hawks are a common sight in urban areas, with individuals such as Pale Male being documented nesting and raising chicks in New York City since at least the 1990s.

The American alligator, a once-threatened species that was saved from extinction through farming and conservation, can frequently be found in the southern United States living in open areas with access to water, such as golf courses and parks, in its native range.

These animals living in urban areas usually come into conflict with humans, as some of them will open garbage bags in search of food, eat food left out for pets, prey on unattended pets, feed on prized garden plants, dig up lawns or become traffic hazards when they run out into the road. Coyotes pose a risk to small children, who should not be left unsupervised in areas that coyotes are known to inhabit; they are large enough to easily kill and eat a child, and urban coyotes lack the fear of humans that most wild canids exhibit. While there are media accounts of alligators being found in sewer pipes and storm drains, "sewer alligators" are unlikely to sustain a breeding population in such environments, due to a lack of a place to bury their eggs and food. Urban wildlife is often considered a nuisance, with local governments being tasked to manage the issue.

In 2009, a large blobby mass made of colonies of tubifex worms was found to be living in the sewers of Raleigh, North Carolina. Revealed by a snake camera inspection of sewer piping under the Cameron Village shopping center, videos of the creature went viral on YouTube in 2009 under the name "Carolina poop monster".

Animals known to dwell within human habitations in the US include house centipedes (Scutigera coleoptrata), and firebrats.

South America
Marmosets can be found living wild in city parks in Brazil. Urban-dwelling marmosets tend to return more often to the same sleeping sites than jungle-dwelling marmosets. Urban-dwelling marmosets tend to prefer to sleep in tall trees with high first branches and smooth bark. It has been suggested they do this to avoid cats.

See also
Satoyama
Urban ecology
Wild animal suffering

References

External links
Wild in the City, a National Film Board of Canada documentary on urban wildlife in Vancouver

 
Wildlife